Stephen Ward Sears (born July 27, 1932) is an American historian specializing in the American Civil War.

Early life and education 
Sears is a graduate of Oberlin College.

Career 
As an author, he has concentrated on the military history of the American Civil War, primarily the battles and leaders of the Army of the Potomac.

He was employed as editor of the Educational Department at the American Heritage Publishing Company.

Personal life 
Sears resides in Connecticut.

Bibliography
 Air War Against Hitler's Germany, American Heritage Publishing Company, Harper & Row, 1964; I Books, 2005, 
 Desert War in North Africa, American Heritage Publishing Company, Harper & Row, 1967; I Books, 2006, 
 The American Heritage history of the automobile in America, Simon & Schuster, 1977, 
Landscape Turned Red: The Battle of Antietam, Houghton Mifflin, 1983.
George B. McClellan: The Young Napoleon, Ticknor & Fields, NY, 1988.
The Civil War Papers of George B. McClellan: Selected Correspondence, 1860–1865, Ticknor & Fields, New York (edited by Sears, 1989), 
To the Gates of Richmond: The Peninsula Campaign, Ticknor & Fields, New York, New York, 1992.
Chancellorsville, Houghton Mifflin, 1996.
Controversies & Commanders: Dispatches from the Army of the Potomac, Houghton Mifflin, 1999.
Gettysburg, Houghton Mifflin, 2003. 
Lincoln's Lieutenants: the High Command of the Army of the Potomac, Houghton Mifflin, 2017.

References

External links 
C-span appearances

1932 births
Living people
21st-century American historians
21st-century American male writers
Historians of the American Civil War
Oberlin College alumni
Writers from Norwalk, Connecticut
Historians from Connecticut
American male non-fiction writers